Danyluk is a surname. Notable people with the surname include:

Andrea Danyluk (1963-2022), American computer scientist and computer science educator
Ray Danyluk (born 1952 or 1953), Canadian politician
Terry Danyluk (born 1960), Canadian volleyball player

See also
 

Ukrainian-language surnames